Toodyay pioneer heritage trail was a trail created by the Toodyay Bicentennial Community Committee in 1988 for the Australian Bicentenary as part of the W.A. Heritage Trails Network.

The brochure created for the trail has the subtitle Early Settlement of Toodyay in the Avon Valley, Western Australia, and it covers 20 km that includes the West Toodyay townsite.

The identified sites were:

 1. Morangup Hill
 2. Morangup Spring
 3. Jimperding Hill Descent
 4. Jimperding Pool and Nolan's Rock
 not numbered but identified "Deepdale homestead"

West Toodyay historic sites:

 5. West Toodyay School
 6. Samuel Ferguson's cottage
 7. Royal Oak Inn
 8. Highland Laddie
 9. Queen's Head Hotel
 10. Military Barracks
 11. Colonial School
 12. Lock Up
 13. Catholic Chapel
 14. Newcastle Recreation Ground and Cottage

The 1988 trail ended at the Duidgee Park Picnic Area  from that point, there were two other trails - the River Gum Trail, and the Newcastle Walking Trail that continued into the Toodyay township.

Notes

Heritage places in Toodyay, Western Australia
Heritage trails in Western Australia
West Toodyay